The Tampa Bay Storm were a professional arena football team based in Tampa, Florida, US. It  played in the Arena Football League (AFL).  Originally the team was located in Pittsburgh, Pennsylvania, and operated as the Pittsburgh Gladiators. The franchise was one of the original four that launched the Arena Football League for its inaugural season in 1987. The club was relocated to Tampa Bay area for the 1991 season, being the last of the original teams to either fold or leave its market.  After 26 years in the Tampa market, the team ceased operations in December, 2017.

The team actually played outside Tampa in nearby St. Petersburg from 1991 to 1996, then in Tampa until 2008, after which point the AFL suspended operations and did not return until the 2010 season following the league's restructuring. It had been in the same city for longer than any other AFL team. During its tenure the franchise won five ArenaBowl championships. With 241 wins, the Storm had won far more games than any other team in AFL history. After the team dissolved in 2017, indoor football in the Tampa Bay area was succeeded by the Tampa Bay Tornadoes who began to play in 2021 in the American Arena League. 

The club was last owned by Jeffrey Vinik, also the owner of the NHL's Tampa Bay Lightning. Home games were played at Amalie Arena in Tampa.

History
The Storm holds the Arena Football League record for the longest tenure by a franchise in a single market area. It was also the last of the original four franchises (the Chicago Bruisers, Denver Dynamite and Washington Commandos were the other three) to have operated in continuous existence from the formation of the league in 1987 until the present decade before ceasing operations.

Pittsburgh Gladiators (1987–1990)

When arena football was first announced in 1986, Jim Foster targeted Pittsburgh, Pennsylvania for an inaugural franchise due to the great football tradition of the area. The franchise was originally known as the Pittsburgh Gladiators, and was one of the original four AFL teams formed in 1987. The team was named by Robert Ninehouser whose entry for the team name was selected in 1987. They originally played their home games at the Pittsburgh Civic Arena in Pittsburgh. On June 19, 1987, the Gladiators defeated the Washington Commandos 48–46 in the first ever AFL regular season game. The Gladiators participated in ArenaBowls I and III, losing both.

Moving to St. Petersburg (1991–1994)
The team moved to St. Petersburg, Florida in 1991, with the team taking on the "Storm" moniker. A Cleveland Arena Football League franchise later bore the Gladiators name; however, other than the coincidental names the two organizations shared no link in histories.

The Storm won the ArenaBowl in its first season in Tampa Bay (V) and has won four subsequent championships (VII, IX, X, and XVII). Up to the 2006 season, the Storm had qualified for the playoffs in every season but one during their time in Tampa Bay.

The team played in the former ThunderDome in St. Petersburg (now called Tropicana Field) from 1991–1996, becoming its first regular team sports tenant. Since 1997, the team played its home games in the Amalie Arena in Tampa and previously known as the Ice Palace, St. Pete Times Forum, and Tampa Bay Times Forum.

Tim Marcum era (1995–2010)
After the 1994 season, Greis sold the team to Peter "Woody" Kern for $850,000. Kern's first move as the Storm owner was the hiring of coach Tim Marcum, who is widely regarded as the greatest coach in arena football history.

On March 14, 2002, Kern had the opportunity to sell the Storm, receiving an offer from Michigan mortgage broker Thom Hopper for what was then a record price of $12 million. Hopper submitted two payments totaling $1.6 million before Kern regained possession of the team. Later in 2006, Hopper pleaded guilty to federal wire fraud charges that authorities say resulted from his attempt to buy the Storm. He was sentenced in January to nearly three years in prison and ordered to pay at least $1.8 million in restitution to a title insurance company, according to media reports.

On December 23, 2004, Sports Illustrated reported that the AFL's players' union filed a grievance against the Storm. The reason was that seven of the Storm's players claimed that some of the diamonds in their 2003 AFL championship rings were fake. Six of the seven players had left the team after the 2003 season. The Storm acknowledged that some of the rings did, in fact, include cubic zirconia instead of diamonds, and that different players received greater amounts of diamonds in their rings based on their contributions that season.

The Storm ended the 2006 season with a 7–9 record (4th in their division), ending a 19-year streak of playoff appearances, dating back to their days as the Gladiators and the start of the Arena Football League.

In December 2007, Kern sold 51% of his stake in the Storm to Robert Nucci for just over $9.6 million, while still maintaining control of the other 49%. The Storm followed a 9–7 season and first-round playoff exit in 2007 with an 8–8 finish in 2008. The team salvaged the .500 record by defeating the Los Angeles Avengers 72–47 in Tampa. There was no 2009 Arena Football League season due to the league's ongoing financial difficulties, which resulted in its filing for Chapter 7 bankruptcy, later converted to Chapter 11, leaving it uncertain if the Storm, arguably the most successful team in the history of any form of indoor football, would ever play another game.

New AFL (2010–2017)

A new arena football league, originally called Arena Football 1, formed in 2009. The Storm was not one of the initial 16 teams announced. However, Bossier-Shreveport Battle Wings owner Dan Newman mentioned that the Storm were one of at least two former AFL franchises that were being negotiated with, the other being the San Jose SaberCats. The new organization bought the rights to the intellectual property, including the team names, logos, histories, and patented rules of the old AFL in a bankruptcy auction, which allowed it to function essentially as a full successor; after this action, the name Arena Football 1 was dropped and the group resumed operating as the Arena Football League. The Storm resumed full operations for the new league's 2010 season, with some players from the former roster, and once again coached by Tim Marcum and this time owned by Tampa Bay Storm Partners LLC, a group led by Todd Boren, a previous partner with the Orlando Predators and the Arizona Rattlers. The AFL released the schedule for the season on December 31, 2009. The Storm returned during the opening weekend of the season on April 3, 2010. On February 17, 2010, it was formally announced that the AF1 had adopted the former Arena Football League name.

In the 2010 season the Storm went 11–5, finishing second in the South Division. In the playoffs, they earned a trip to ArenaBowl XXIII, but lost to the Spokane Shock 57–69.

On February 17, 2011, Marcum would resign as head coach of the Storm less than a month before the 2011 season was to begin, after having the position for 15 years. He left as the AFL's all-time winningest head coach with 211 wins. Dave Ewart was named as the team's new head coach the next day. His resignation was sparked by an admission in a deposition related to a lawsuit he had filed against the Storm's previous owner, Robert Nucci. In that deposition, Marcum admitted to forwarding emails that were pornographic and racially tinged to other members of the Storm organization, using his work email address. In April 2011, former Tampa Bay Buccaneers linebacker Derrick Brooks became a part owner and the team president for the Storm. After a 7–4 start to the 2013 season, the Storm lost the final seven games of the season, but still qualified for the postseason. The Storm played well in their playoff game, but came up just short against the Jacksonville Sharks. The team's collapse lead to the firing of Ewart. One month later, the team announced they had promoted offensive coordinator, and Storm legend Lawrence Samuels to the team's head coach. Samuels and the Storm mutually agreed to part ways in August 2016. On October 25, 2016, Ron James was named the head coach. In 2017, the Storm finished the regular season with a 10–4 record and later advanced to ArenaBowl XXX, where they lost to the Philadelphia Soul by a score of 44–40.

In December 2017, the Storm announced it was ceasing operations due to increasing operating costs combined with decreasing team revenue. Ownership did not rule out future participation in a "stronger, reinvented AFL." The Storm was the last of the original four AFL teams to cease operations.

Storm highlights
 In a 1996 playoff game against the Arizona Rattlers the Storm had the lead late in the game, but the Rattlers came down the field and scored a touchdown with little time left on the clock. Rather than try to tie the game with an extra point, Rattlers coach Danny White elected to go for the win with the two-point conversion. Quarterback Sherdrick Bonner was stopped short and the Storm won the game. On the AFL's 20 Greatest Highlights this is ranked at number 10.
 During a 1991 regular season game, the Storm found themselves down 17 points against the Albany Firebirds. However, they rallied late in the game to take a 57–53 lead. But it wasn't over yet as the Firebirds had five seconds left to come up with the touchdown from midfield. The Storm won the game with an interception off of the nets. On the AFL's 20 Greatest Highlights Countdown, this is ranked #8.
 ArenaBowl V found the Detroit Drive hosting the Tampa Bay Storm. With seconds left in the game, quarterback Jay Gruden threw deep to Stevie Thomas in the endzone. It was complete, and the Storm won the ArenaBowl. On the AFL's 20 Greatest Highlights Countdown, this is ranked number 5.
 Stevie Thomas saves the Storm: During a 1995 semifinal game between Albany and Tampa Bay, Albany took a late one-point lead with seconds left on the clock. On the ensuing kickoff the Storm couldn't field the ball off the nets and Stevie Thomas found himself in the very back of the endzone. Thomas broke five tackles at once coming out of the endzone and went all the way for a touchdown to give the Storm the win 56–49. They later went on to capture their 3rd ArenaBowl in 5 years. On the AFL's 20 Greatest Highlights Countdown, this is at #2.
 On March 16, 2012, the Storm became the first AFL team to win 200 games in league history with a 50–47 victory over the Georgia Force.
The Storm had a heated rivalry with the Orlando Predators known as the War on I-4. Both teams found success and faced each other in the ArenaBowl and playoffs numerous times.

Players

Final roster

Retired numbers

Arena Football Hall of Famers

Individual awards

All-Arena players
The following Gladiators/Storm players were named to All-Arena Teams:
 QB Willie Totten (1), Jay Gruden (2), Peter Tom Willis (1), Brett Dietz (1)
 FB/LB Lynn Bradford (1), Andre Bowden (3), Cedric McKinnon (1), Les Barley (1)
 WR Joe Hills (1), T. T. Toliver (1)
 WR/DB Russell Hairston (1), Mike Stoops (1), Alvin Williams (1), Thomas Monroe (1), Julius Dawkins (1), Melvin Cunningham (1)
 WR/LB Stevie Thomas (1), Lawrence Samuels (4)
 OL Tom Kaleita (1), George Bussey (1)
 DL Tim McGill (3), Jermaine Smith (1)
 OL/DL Craig Walls (2), Keith Browner (1), Tom Gizzi (1), Deatrich Wise (1), Kent Wells (2), Willie Wyatt (4), Sylvester Bembery (2), Rod Williams (1), B. J. Cohen (1), Nyle Wiren (1)
 LB Lawrence Samuels (1), Cliff Dukes (2)
 DB James Harrell (1)
 K Matt Black (1)
 DS Corey Dowden (1), Tracey Perkins (2), Johnnie Harris (1), Tommy Henry (1), Omarr Smith (1)
 OS/KR Stevie Thomas (1), James Bowden (1)

All-Ironman players
The following Gladiators/Storm players were named to All-Ironman Teams: 
 FB/LB Les Barley (1), Andre Bowden (1), Torrance Marshall (1)
 WR/DB T. T. Toliver (1)
 WR/LB Lawrence Samuels (4)
 OL/DL B. J. Cohen (1)

All-Rookie players
The following Gladiators/Storm players were named to All-Rookie Teams:
 QB Brett Dietz
 OL/DL Al Lucas
 OS Charles Wilson
 DS Tommy Henry
 K Matt Huerkamp

Coaches of note

Head coaches

Staff

Cheerleaders
The Storm created an official cheerleading squad called the "Storm Cheerleaders."

Radio and television
The Tampa Bay Storm games were broadcast on Storm Radio, which was on 1250-AM WHNZ. The final radio play-by-play announcer was Darek Sharp, who was also a producer and broadcaster for AM 620 WDAE, and the radio color commentator was Ian Beckles.

Season-by-season

References

External links
 Official website 
 Tampa Bay Storm at ArenaFan
 Pittsburgh Gladiators at ArenaFan

 
1991 disestablishments in Florida
2017 disestablishments in Florida